Ragnvald Vaage (29 April 1889 – 27 June 1966) was a Norwegian poet, novelist and children's writer.

Biography
He was born at Husnes in Kvinnherad, Norway. His parents were Ola Larsson Vaage (1844–97) and Ragnhild Larsdotter Oppsanger (1855–89).
In 1906 he started at Voss Folk High School (Voss Folkehøgskule) at Seim where he stayed for two years. Then he spent a year at Jæren and studied horticulture. He later attended Askov College (Askov Højskole) in Vejen.

His first poetry collections were Liv som strir (1912), Bylgja  (1913)  and Strengspel   (1914). Among his children's books are Gutane på Tedneholmen (1923) Den forunderlege vegen  (1949), Den gode sumaren (1955) and the prize-winning Stivnakkane (1957).
His novel Den vonde draumen (1953)  was awarded with Sunnmørsprisen.

He was married in 1916 with Dorothea Raunehaug (1892-1973) and was the grandfather of author and playwright Lars Amund Vaage.

Awards
Melsom Prize (Melsom-prisen) - 1942 (jointly with Inge Krokann) 
 Sunnmør Prize (Sunnmørsprisen) - 1953

References

1889 births
1966 deaths
People from Kvinnherad
20th-century Norwegian poets
Norwegian male poets
Norwegian children's writers
Norwegian male novelists
20th-century Norwegian novelists
20th-century Norwegian male writers